Midlands Technical College is a public technical college with multiple locations in the Richland, Lexington, and Fairfield counties of South Carolina. The college is one of South Carolina's largest two-year college with approximately 16,000 students.  It offers approximately one hundred associate degrees, diplomas and certificate programs of study and is the largest source of transfer students to the University of South Carolina-Columbia.

History 
In 1947, the South Carolina Area Trade Schools (SCATS) Act established the South Carolina Area Trade School Columbia Campus to provide skilled and educated workers to meet the expanding labor needs of the community. In 1969, the name was changed to Columbia Technical Education Center (TEC) and it became part of the State Committee for Technical Education, which was responsible for guiding the technical programs in the state. The site of the Columbia Technical Education Center is now the Airport Campus of Midlands Technical College.

Richland Technical Education Center (Richland TEC) was established in 1963 to address the need for specialized training for industrial growth, and the first students were enrolled in the fall of 1963. By 1969, the school's enrollment expanded to 1,200 students and Lexington County officials joined forces with Richland County to form the Richland-Lexington Counties Commission for Technical Education. With this partnership, the name of the school was changed to Midlands Technical Education Center (TEC).

Approximately 15,500 students were enrolled in Midlands Technical Education Center between the years 1969-1974. Major programs of study were offered in engineering technologies, business and allied health. The site of the Midlands Technical Education Center is now the Beltline Campus of Midlands Technical College.

Palmer College in Columbia, a private business college, joined with the State Tech Board in 1973. At that time, Palmer College annually enrolled 1,000 students in 16 associate degree and diploma programs. On March 21, 1973, the Columbia Technical Education Center, Midlands Technical Education Center and Palmer College in Columbia merged to form a single, multi-campus college. This new college operated as three separate entities governed by one local commission through June 1974. On July 1 of that year, the three separate institutions merged to form Midlands Technical College under the guidance of the Richland-Lexington Counties Commission for Technical Education.

Campuses 
Midlands Technical College has six campuses:
 Beltline Campus, located at 316 South Beltline Blvd. Columbia, SC, consists of 12 buildings, library facilities, and an Academic Success Center. It is currently the only campus where both industrial and engineering technology classes are offered.
 Fairfield Campus, located at 1674 Hwy 321 North Business, Winnsboro, SC
 Harbison Campus, located at 7300 College St., Irmo, SC has seven buildings.
 Northeast Campus is the site of MTC's Enterprise Campus and the MTC Center of Excellence for Technology. The campus consists of  developable adjacent to the MTC Center of Excellence for Technology, and offers proximity to the Carolina Research Park, major Interstates and shared technology-specific spaces.
 Batesburg-Leesville Campus, is the newest campus and opened in the fall of 2007.
 In addition, a center is located at Fort Jackson, on the Fort Jackson base, which offers classes primarily for military service personnel.

References

External links
 Official website

Universities and colleges accredited by the Southern Association of Colleges and Schools
Education in Richland County, South Carolina
Education in Lexington County, South Carolina
Education in Fairfield County, South Carolina
Education in Columbia, South Carolina
South Carolina Technical College System
1947 establishments in South Carolina
Educational institutions established in 1947